The Greechans are a family of bowls players from Jersey. Both Lindsey Greechan and Thomas Greechan, wife and husband, compete both indoor and outdoor, as does their daughter Chloe Greechan. Thomas, Lindsey and Helen (Thomas' mother) are all British champions while Thomas, Lindsey and Chloe have all won the IIBC Championships on at least one occasion each. Lindsey, Thomas and Helen have also represented Jersey at the Commonwealth Games.

Bowls Profiles

Lindsey Greechan

Thomas Greechan

Chloe Greechan 

In 2015, Chloe Greechan became the youngest IIBC Champion at 14-years-old, winning the Mixed Pairs title with her father, Thomas. Her parents had lost in the final of the same event in 2008 to another husband-and-wife team of Mervyn and Suzanne King in a tie-break set. She retained the title a year later (with Malcolm De Sousa).

Helen Greechan 

Helen Russell Greechan represented Jersey in the women's triples at the 2010 Commonwealth Games and has won the 2014 pairs title at the British Isles Women's Bowls Championships.

Titles and finals

References 

Jersey bowls players
Jersey sportspeople
Commonwealth Games bowls players
Bowls players at the 2002 Commonwealth Games
Bowls players at the 2014 Commonwealth Games
Living people
Year of birth missing (living people)
Commonwealth Games competitors for Jersey